Daniela Carraro (born 25 March 1985) is a Brazilian sports shooter. She competed in the women's skeet event at the 2016 Summer Olympics.

References

1985 births
Living people
Brazilian female sport shooters
Olympic shooters of Brazil
Shooters at the 2016 Summer Olympics
Place of birth missing (living people)
South American Games gold medalists for Brazil
South American Games medalists in shooting
Competitors at the 2014 South American Games
20th-century Brazilian women
21st-century Brazilian women